This article provides details of people who have been members of more than one Australian legislature. These consist of:
 the Commonwealth Parliament
 6 state (previously colonial) parliaments
 2 territory legislative assemblies.

History
 On 7 February 1788 the colony of New South Wales was established
 On 3 December 1825, the colony of Van Diemen's Land was separated from New South Wales
 The Swan River Colony was established in 1829, and renamed Western Australia in 1832
 On 28 December 1836, the colony of South Australia was separated from New South Wales 
 On 1 July 1851, the colony of Victoria was separated from New South Wales 
 In 1855 Victoria gained self-government
 In 1856 Van Diemen's Land gained self-government and changed its name to Tasmania
 In 1856 New South Wales gained self-government
 In 1857 South Australia gained self-government
 On 6 June 1859, the colony of Queensland was separated from New South Wales and established as a self-governing colony
 In 1890 Western Australia gained self-government
 On 1 January 1901, the Commonwealth of Australia came into being, and the status of the six colonies (New South Wales, Victoria, Queensland, South Australia, Western Australia and Tasmania) changed to states of the Commonwealth
 On 1 January 1911, the area of the Federal Capital Territory (later renamed Australian Capital Territory) was separated from New South Wales
 In 1922 the upper house of the Queensland Parliament was abolished
 In 1978 the Northern Territory gained self-government
 In 1989 the Australian Capital Territory gained self-government.

List of members of multiple legislatures
 The following tables are sorted by year of entry to the second legislature, and alphabetically within years. 
 Years in bold indicate the year of entry to the member's second legislature.
 People who represented different states since 1901 are shown in a dark border.

Prior to Federation (1901)

1901

1902-1919

1920-1939

1940-1975

1976-1996

1997-2022

References

Members of state and territorial legislatures in Australia
Lists of members of state and territorial legislatures in Australia
Australia